Daxing Township is a township under the administration of Tongjiang County, Sichuan, China. , it has five villages under its administration.

See also 
 List of township-level divisions of Sichuan

References 

Township-level divisions of Sichuan
Tongjiang County